The 2015 Réunion Premier League was the 66th season of the Réunion Premier League, the professional league for association football clubs in Réunion, since the league's establishment in 1950. The season started on 28 March and concluded on 29 November 2015.

Standings
  1.JS Saint-Pierroise              22  15  4  3  45-16  71  Champions
  2.SS Saint-Louisienne             22  12  7  3  28-12  65
  3.US Sainte-Marienne              22  12  5  5  41-20  63
  4.AS Excelsior (Saint-Joseph)     22  11  8  3  35-19  63
  5.Saint-Pauloise FC               22  11  2  9  26-22  57
  6.AS Marsouins (Saint-Leu)        22  11  2  9  24-25  57
  7.SS Jeanne d'Arc (Le Port)       22   8  4 10  27-29  50
  8.SDEFA (Saint-Denis)             22   6  7  9  14-23  47
  9.AJ Petite-Ile                   22   5  5 12  19-34  42
 10.SS Capricorne (Saint-Pierre)    22   5  4 13  21-40  41
 ----------------------------------------------------------
 11.ARC Bras Fusil                  22   4  4 14  13-32  38
 12.US Bénédictins                  22   3  6 13  14-35  37

References

Football competitions in Réunion
Premier League
Reunion